The non-fiction book Close-up  is a 2022 book authored by Jiwan Parajuli, based on the dimensions and characters of Nepali films. The book has successfully presented an insider's view of how the Nepali film industry has come to be and its evolution over the years.

References 

2022 non-fiction books